Lina Antanavičienė has been the Lithuanian Ambassador to Israel since August 2019 and ambassador to China from 2010 until 2015.  While in Beijing, she served as Ambassador Extraordinary and Plenipotentiary to Mongolia, South Korea, and Vietnam from 2011 until 2015.

References

Ambassadors of Lithuania to China
Ambassadors of Lithuania to Israel
Lithuanian women ambassadors
Ambassadors of Lithuania to South Korea
Ambassadors of Lithuania to Mongolia
Ambassadors of Lithuania to Vietnam
Year of birth missing (living people)
Living people